is a Japanese manga series written and illustrated by TNSK. It has been serialized in Kodansha's seinen manga magazine good! Afternoon since January 2019 and has been collected in ten tankōbon volumes as of February 2023. An anime television series adaptation produced by Liden Films aired from September to December 2022.

Plot

Characters

A tanuki girl

A seven tailed kitsune

Media

Manga
My Master Has No Tail is written and illustrated by TNSK. The series began serialization in Kodansha's good! Afternoon on January 7, 2019. Kodansha has collected its chapters into individual tankōbon volumes. The first volume was released on September 6, 2019. As of February 7, 2023, ten volumes have been released. The manga is licensed digitally in North America by Kodansha USA.

Anime
An anime television series adaptation was announced in the September 2021 issue of good! Afternoon. It is produced by Liden Films and directed by Hideyo Yamamoto, with Touko Machida supervising the scripts co-written by Kei Shimobayashi, Aya Satsuki, and Yūho Togashi. Ryō Yamauchi is designing the characters and serving as chief animation director. Tsukasa Yatoki, Atsushi Harada, and Yuki Honda from Arte Refact are composing the music. The series aired from September 30 to December 23, 2022, on Tokyo MX, MBS, and BS Asahi. Sentai Filmworks licensed the series, and will be streaming it on HIDIVE. Medialink licensed the series in Asia-Pacific and will be streaming it on Ani-One Asia YouTube channel.

References

External links
 
My Master Has No Tail official anime website 

2019 manga
Anime series based on manga
Comedy anime and manga
Fantasy anime and manga
Historical fantasy anime and manga
Kodansha manga
Liden Films
Medialink
Rakugo
Sentai Filmworks
Taishō period in fiction
Television shows set in Osaka
Tokyo MX original programming